Iskitimsky District is an administrative and municipal district (raion), one of the thirty in Novosibirsk Oblast, Russia. It is located in the east of the oblast. Its administrative center is the town of Iskitim (which is not administratively a part of the district). Population: 62,816 (2010 Census);

Geography

Rivers
 Koyon River
 Berd River

Administrative and municipal status

Within the framework of administrative divisions, Iskitimsky District is one of the thirty in the oblast. The town of Iskitim serves as its administrative center, despite being incorporated separately as an administrative unit with the status equal to that of the districts.

As a municipal division, the district is incorporated as Iskitimsky Municipal District. The Town of Iskitim is incorporated separately from the district as Iskitim Urban Okrug.

References

Notes

Sources

Districts of Novosibirsk Oblast
